Salehabad County (Šahrestâne Zave) is in Razavi Khorasan province, Iran. The capital of the county is Salehabad. At the 2006 census, the county's population (as Salehabad District of Torbat-e Jam County) was 43,212 in 9,496 households. The following census in 2011 counted 45,695 people in 11,095 households. At the 2016 census, the district's population was 43,426 in 11,485 households. It was separated from Torbat-e Jam County in 2018 to become Salehabad County.

Administrative divisions

The population history of Salehabad County's administrative divisions (as Salehabad District of Torbat-e Jam County) over three consecutive censuses is shown in the following table.

References

 

Counties of Razavi Khorasan Province